Andras is a masculine given name. Notable people with the name include:

Andras Angyal (1902–1960), Hungarian American psychologist
Andras Guttormsson (circa 1490-1544), First Minister of the Faroe Islands
Andras Jones (born 1968), American actor

See also
András, a Hungarian masculine given name

Masculine given names